Haraldur Magnús (born 16 March 1991) is an Icelandic professional golfer who plays on the Challenge Tour and in the Nordic Golf League. He participated in the 2018 Open Championship, becoming the first Icelandic golfer to compete in a men's major golf championship.

Early life
Magnús grew up in Reykjavík, Iceland, and attended college at the University of Louisiana at Lafayette.

Career
Magnús took part in the Amateur Championship of 2015, and turned professional in the following year. In 2018, he came through final qualifying for the 2018 Open Championship at Prince's Golf Club. A second-round 78 saw him miss the cut.

In 2021, Magnús finish tied for the lead at the B-NL Challenge Trophy on the Challenge Tour to get into a playoff with Alfredo García-Heredia, Marcus Helligkilde and Michael Hoey. He was eliminated on the third hole.

Playoff record
Challenge Tour playoff record (0–1)

Results in major championships 

CUT = missed the half-way cut

Team appearances
Amateur
European Boys' Team Championship (representing Iceland): 2008

References

External links
 
 

Icelandic male golfers
Louisiana Ragin' Cajuns men's golfers
Sportspeople from Reykjavík
1991 births
Living people